Matale (Sinhala: මාතලේ) is the administrative capital city of the Matale District. It is the most urbanised and populated centre in the district. Matale is also the second largest municipal and urban centre in central province after Kandy. Surrounding the city are the Knuckles Mountain Range, the foothills were called Wiltshire by the British. They have also called this place as Matelle.

History
Matale is the only district of Sri Lanka, where an ancient book of written history is found. It is known as Pannagamam - பன்னாகமம் ("Five Headed Serpent" in English) of Goddess Muthumari in Sri Muthumariamman Temple.

The most important historical incident in Matale is writing the thripitaka which was held during the ruling period of king Walagamba in 89-77 BC in Aluvihare, Therefore, this is permanent evidence for human settlements in Matale before centuries of years. There are folklores receipt of the name “Matale”. It is mentioned that “Mahatala” become as Matale because it is placed in a valley and also the King Gajaba invaded “Soli Rata” and brought and settled 12,000 peoples in here it is become as Matale. There are number of folktales about the name of Matale. Mahathala has been used for large valley area. It gradually converted as Matale.

The Aluvihare Rock Temple that is situated on north side of the city's suburb, Aluvihare. The historic location where the Pali Canon was written down completely in text on ola (palm) leaves in 29 BCE.

Matale was the site of a major battle in 1848 when the Matale Rebellion started and the British garrison in the Fort MacDowall in Matale was placed under siege by the rebels led by Weera Puran Appu and Gongalegoda Banda.

The city is also the birthplace of Monarawila Keppetipola, a rebel who led the Wellasa rebellion against the British troops. His ancestral home, Kappetipola walawuwa, still exists at Hulangamuwa, Matale.

Attractions
 Aluvihare Rock Temple
 Anagarika Dharmapala monument
 Christ Church, Matale
 Fort MacDowall 
 Knuckles Mountain Range
 Matale clock tower
 Matale railway station, the former terminus of the Colombo railway (completed in 1880)
 Sri Muthumariyamman Temple
 Nandamithra Ekanayake International Hockey Ground
 Weera Monarawila Keppetipola Monument
 Weera Puranappu Monument

Economy
The city is surrounded by large plantations and is famous for its spice gardens. In addition to agriculture, the main economic activities include tourism,  business and trade. Population growth, urban expansion and economic development in Matale have created regulatory and management challenges.Matale Municipal Council Area (MMCA)

Education 

Matale is home to some of the island's oldest and leading colleges and schools.

 Government Science College
 Amina Girl's National School, Matale
 Christ Church College, Matale
 Greenwood College International, Matale
 Matale Hindu College, Matale
 Matale International School
 Pakkiyam National School, Matale
 Royal English School Matale
 St. Thomas' College, Matale
 St. Thomas' Girls' School, Matale
 Sinhala Buddhist College, Matale
 Sri Sangamitta Balika National School, Matale
 Sujatha Balika School, Matale
 Technical College, Matale
 Vijaya College, Matale
 Vijayapala Collage, Matale
 Zahira College, Matale

Demographics 
The population of the city's urban area's is mix of numerous ethnic groups. The Sinhalese make the majority in the city. Muslims are the second largest group in the city. Others include Sri Lankan Tamils, small numbers of Indian Tamils, Burgher and Malay.

Ethnicity in Matale Urban Area (2007) 
Source:statistics.gov.lk

Ethnicity in Matale Metro Area (2012) 
Source:statistics.gov.lk

Suburbs 
 Agalawatta (MC)
 Aluvihare (MC)
 Hulangamuwa (MC)
 Kaludewala (MC)
 Mandandawela (MC)
 Palapathwela (PS)
 Ukuwela (PS)
 Yatawatta (PS)

Notable personalities  
 Alick Aluwihare, politician
 A. S. Jayawardena, Governor Central Bank of Sri Lanka
 Chanaka Welegedara, International cricketer
 Damith Wijayathunga, model and actor
 Dayan Witharana, singer and photographer
 Ehelepola Nilame, a minister in King Sri Vikrama Rajasinha's royal court
 Hemal Ranasinghe, model and actor
 Keppetipola Disawe, leader of the Great Rebellion of Uva in 1818
 Kingsley Jayasekera, actor and singer
 Kumar Sangakkara, International cricketer
 Prabath Jayasuriya, International cricketer
 Ven. Premananda, Hindu guru
 Richard Aluwihare, first Ceylonese Inspector General of Police
 Richard Udugama, first Sinhalese Buddhist Army Commander
 Sanath Wimalasiri, dramatist and dancer
 Gen. Shavendra Silva, Commander of the 58 Division during the Sri Lankan Civil War, current Commander of the Sri Lanka Army
 William Gopallawa, last Governor-General of Ceylon and first president of Republic of Sri Lanka

References

External links 

 The Official website of Sri Muthumariamman Thevasthanam
 Knuckles range nature preservation centre
 Discover Sri Lanka - More information & images about Matale
 The official web site of Aluvihara rock cave temple

 
Kingdom of Kandy